Katze im Sack (English title: Let the Cat Out of the Bag) is a German drama film directed by  and written by Michael Proehl.  The film's tagline translates to English as A romantic film for those who don't like romantic films.  Set primarily in Leipzig, two apparently lost souls find one another but struggle to find romance against circumstances and their own divisive personalities.

The two lead characters, Karl played by Christoph Bach and Doris Jule Böwe, have a chance meeting on a train.  The pair steal minor items from one another during the journey and that theft leads Karl to attempt to track down Doris to her place of work at a bar in Leipzig.  Once in Leipzig, the pair each make convoluted attempts to get to know the other in a series of events coloured by disaffected members of Leipzig society including an older male friend of Doris and a brothel owner.

Awards
The film was awarded the First Steps Award as Best Young Filmmakers Award in 2004.  At the Max-Ophüls-Festival 2005 it received the best music award.  The film was also shown at the Berlinale.

References

External links

2005 films
2005 romantic drama films
Films set in Leipzig
German romantic drama films
2000s German-language films
2000s German films